Salmanabad (also Romanized as Salmānābād; also known as Salmānābād-e Gonbagī) is a village in Gonbaki Rural District, Gonbaki District, Rigan County, Kerman Province, Iran. At the 2006 census, its population was 194, in 51 families.

References 

Populated places in Rigan County